Houstonian may refer to:

A native or resident of Houston
Houstonian (train), a passenger train operated by the Missouri Pacific from Houston to New Orleans
The Houstonian (newspaper), the newspaper of Sam Houston State University
The official yearbook of the University of Houston
The Houstonian Hotel, a luxury hotel in Houston